Pontibacter akesuensis  is a bacterium from the genus of Pontibacter which has been isolated from desert soil in Akesu in China.

References

Further reading

External links 
Type strain of Pontibacter akesuensis at BacDive -  the Bacterial Diversity Metadatabase

Cytophagia
Bacteria described in 2007